Makoto Shibata (Japanese: 柴田 誠, Hepburn: Shibata Makoto) is a Japanese video game director and scenario writer. He is better known as the creator of the Fatal Frame series.

Work

Video games

Films

External links 

 
 Makoto Shibata on MobyGames
 Makoto Shibata on Twitter

Japanese video game directors
Video game writers
Year of birth missing (living people)
Living people